Emília Barreto Corrêa Lima  (10 April 1934 – 4 February 2022) was a Brazilian beauty queen. She was the second-ever Miss Brazil, a title which was awarded to her in 1955.

Biography
Barreto was born in Sobral and grew up in Camocim. After her victory in the Miss Brazil competition, she received a letter from Rachel de Queiroz. She was subsequently one of the semifinalists for Miss Universe 1955. She was also the first-ever  and represented . During her time as reigning Miss Brazil, she kept a low profile, only attending charitable events and refusing to charge for her presence.

She married engineer Wilson Santa Cruz Caldas in 1956, with whom she had four children: Nelson, Marília, Emília, and Anna Cecília. She was also the maternal grandmother of actor .

Barreto died in Rio de Janeiro on 4 February 2022, at the age of 87.

References

1934 births
2022 deaths
Miss Brazil winners
Miss Universe 1955 contestants
People from Sobral, Ceará